SingShot Media was initially a social networking song-sharing platform, headquartered in San Francisco, CA, United States. They were acquired by Electronic Arts on February 12, 2007. It was acquired in order to expand EA's community-building and user-generated content. The online The Sims on Stage was created by the company after their acquisition by EA.

References

External links
 Official homepage of Electronic Arts

Electronic Arts
Defunct video game companies of the United States
2007 mergers and acquisitions